In the Nude is an album by the American musician Luther Campbell, released in 1993. The album reached No. 54 on the Billboard 200 and No. 8 on the Top R&B Albums chart.

"Cowards in Compton" is a diss track directed toward Snoop Doggy Dogg and Dr. Dre; Campbell also made references to Dre's World Class Wreckin' Cru fashion choices. H-Town performed on "Bust a Nut".

Critical reception

AllMusic wrote that "Luke betrays a softer side on the funky 'Tell Me What You Know', an almost tender tribute to African-American women."

Track listing
"Do You Hear the Lambs Calling"- 2:10  
"Work It Out"- 3:07  
"We're Fuckin'"- :42  
"Bad Land Boogie"- 3:54 *feat. Home Team
"I Got a Fuckin' Headache"- :31  
"Tell Me What You Know"- 6:04  
"Dre's Momma Needs a Haircut"- 1:03 (Diss track aimed at Dr. Dre, Snoop Dogg and Death Row Records)     
"Cowards in Compton"- 3:59 *feat. JT Money & Clayvoisie (Diss track aimed at Dr. Dre, Snoop Dogg and Death Row Records)
"Head, Head & More Head, Pt. II"- 4:30 *feat. JT Money & Jiggie Gee
"Weenie Roast"- :39  
"Menege a Trois, Pt. II"- 5:06  
"Pimple on My Dick"- :50  
"The Hero"- 3:19  
"Whatever"- 5:17  
"Stop Looking at My Dick"- :50  
"The Hop"- 4:08  
"L.L.O.L.M."- 1:25  
"Freestyle Joint"- 5:27 *feat. Home Team, JT Money, Clayvoise & Fresh Kid Ice
"$100 Bet"- 1:13  
"Bust a Nut"- 5:12  *feat. H-Town
"Wear a Rubber"- 1:11  
"Take It Off"- 4:35  
"The Boy Got Some Dick"- :24  
"Headbanger"- 4:19  
"Good to the Last Drop"- :26  
"Shout Outs"- 6:15

References

Luther Campbell albums
1993 albums
Luke Records albums